The Kehewin Cree Nation is a First Nations band government in northern Alberta. A signatory to Treaty 6, it controls one Indian reserve, Kehewin 123, and shares ownership of another, Blue Quills.

References

First Nations governments in Alberta
Cree governments